Oxyurichthys is a genus of fish in the subfamily Gobionellinae, commonly known as arrowfin gobies. They are distributed in the tropical and subtropical Indian and Pacific Oceans; one species is also known from the western Atlantic Ocean. Most species live in shallow waters under 10 meters deep over fine substrates such as silt.

Species
The following species are recognized in the genus Oxyurichthys:
 Oxyurichthys auchenolepis Bleeker, 1876 (scaly-nape tentacle goby) 
 Oxyurichthys chinensis Pezold & Larson, 2015
 Oxyurichthys cornutus McCulloch & Waite, 1918 (horned tentacle goby) 
 Oxyurichthys guibei J.L.B. Smith, 1959
 Oxyurichthys heisei Pezold, 1998
 Oxyurichthys keiensis (J.L.B. Smith, 1938) (Kei goby)
 Oxyurichthys lemayi (J.L.B. Smith, 1947) (lace goby) 
 Oxyurichthys limophilus Pezold & Larson, 2015
 Oxyurichthys lonchotus (O. P. Jenkins, 1903) (speartail mudgoby) 
 Oxyurichthys microlepis (Bleeker, 1849) (maned goby) 
 Oxyurichthys mindanensis (Herre, 1927)
 Oxyurichthys notonema (M. C. W. Weber, 1909) (threadfin mudgoby) 
 Oxyurichthys ophthalmonema (Bleeker, 1856) (eyebrow goby) 
 Oxyurichthys papuensis (Valenciennes, 1837) (frogface goby) 
 Oxyurichthys paulae Pezold, 1998 (jester goby) 
 Oxyurichthys petersii (Klunzinger, 1871)
 Oxyurichthys stigmalophius (Mead & J. E. Böhlke, 1958) (spotfin goby)
 Oxyurichthys takagi Pezold, 1998
 Oxyurichthys tentacularis (Valenciennes, 1837)
 Oxyurichthys uronema (M. C. W. Weber, 1909) (longtail tentacle goby) 
 Oxyurichthys viridis Herre, 1927
 Oxyurichthys visayanus Herre, 1927
 Oxyurichthys zeta Pezold & Larson, 2015

References

 
Gobionellinae
Taxa named by Pieter Bleeker
Marine fish genera